Old Lutherans were originally German Lutherans in the Kingdom of Prussia, notably in the Province of Silesia, who refused to join the Prussian Union of churches in the 1830s and 1840s.  Prussia's king Frederick William III was determined to unify the Protestant churches, to homogenize their liturgy, organization and even their architecture. In a series of proclamations over several years the Church of the Prussian Union was formed, bringing together the majority group of Lutherans, the minority of Reformed. The main effect was that the government of Prussia had full control over church affairs, with the king recognized as the leading bishop.

Attempted suppression of the Old Lutherans led many to emigrate to Australia, Canada, and the United States, resulting in the creation of significant Lutheran denominations in those countries.

The legacy of Old Lutherans also survives in the Independent Evangelical Lutheran Church in modern Germany.

The Prussian Union

In 1799 King Frederick William III of Prussia issued a decree for a new common liturgical Agenda (service book) to be published, for use in both the Lutheran and Reformed congregations. To accomplish this, a commission to prepare a common agenda was formed.

After more than 20 years of effort, a common liturgical agenda was finally published in 1821.  The agenda was not well received by many Lutherans, as it was seen to compromise in the wording of the Words of Institution, to the point where the Real Presence of Christ in the Eucharist was not proclaimed.

The Protestant congregations were directed in 1822 to use only the newly formulated agenda for worship. This met with strong objections and non-compliance from Lutheran pastors around Prussia.

The liturgical agenda was subsequently modified to appease many of the objections of the dissenting Lutherans, and in 1830 Frederick William ordered all Protestant congregations in Prussia to celebrate the Lord's Supper using the new agenda.

Rather than having the unifying effect that Frederick William desired, the decree created a great deal of dissent among Lutheran congregations.

In a compromise with dissenters, who had now earned the name "Old Lutherans", in 1834 Frederick William issued a decree which stated that Union would only be in the areas of governance and liturgy, but the respective congregations could retain their confessional identities. In addition to this, dissenters were forbidden from organizing sectarian groups.

In defiance of this decree, a number of Lutheran pastors and congregations continued to use the old liturgical agenda and sacramental rites of the Lutheran church.

Becoming aware of this defiance, officials sought out those who acted against the decree. Pastors who were caught were suspended from their ministry. If suspended pastors were caught acting in a pastoral role, they were imprisoned.

Among the leaders of the Old Lutherans was Johann Gottfried Scheibel (1783-1843).  Scheibel was a professor of theology in Breslau from 1818 until 1830 when he was suspended from his post for his dissenting views.

Scheibel came to prominence as a leader of the Old Lutherans in the dissent against the Prussian Union. He spoke, preached and wrote against the Union, which consequently resulted in suspension from his post as theological professor.

Undaunted, Scheibel continued in his dissent as he moved to new cities. He was at Dresden in 1832 where he was ordered to leave that same year. He moved to Hermsdorf, where likewise he was asked to leave in 1836, then on to Glauchau and Nuremberg.

He died at Nuremberg about the time that he was being restored to his post as professor at Breslau.

After Scheibel, Eduard Huschke became the leader of Old Lutherans. Other famous Old Lutherans included Henrik Steffens, H. E. F. Guericke, Kahnis and Rudolf Rocholl.

Union also caused a confessional Lutheran counter-reaction called Neo-Lutheranism.

Upon Frederick William's death in 1840, persecution of the Old Lutherans eased substantially. However, Old Lutherans continued to find themselves marginalized, especially the clergy who did not have many of the same rights and support accorded to clergy of the Union church.

Old Lutherans formed several synods (e.g. in 1841 the Evangelical Lutheran Church in Prussia, seated in Breslau, officially recognised on 23 July 1845), which through various mergers eventually resulted in the present-day Independent Evangelical-Lutheran Church (SELK).

Immigration to Australia, New Zealand and America
By 1835 many dissenting Old Lutheran groups were looking to emigration as a means to finding religious freedom. Some groups emigrated to Australia and the United States in the years leading up to 1841.

Australian and New Zealand migration

The first Lutherans to come to Australia in any significant number were immigrants from Prussia, who arrived in South Australia in 1838 with Pastor August Kavel. These immigrants created three settlements at Klemzig, Hahndorf, and Glen Osmond.  In 1841, a second wave of Prussian immigrants arrived, led by Pastor Gotthard Fritzsche. His group settled in Lobethal and Bethanien.

The Lutherans in South Australia established the Killalpaninna Mission (Bethesda) Station at Cooper's Creek. Johann Flierl, the pioneer missionary of German New Guinea, served there for seven years (1878-1885). When he left for Kaiser-Wilhelmsland in 1885, his cousin, also named Johann Flierl, replaced him at the mission.

There have been five waves of migration into the Lutheran Church in New Zealand:
In the 1840s people came from Germany. 
In the 1860s a second wave of migrants from Germany settled in Marton in the Rangitikei. Some had first settled in Australia.  
In the 1870s significant numbers arrived from Denmark and the rest of Scandinavia. 
In the years after World War II many came from Europe. 
In the early part of the 21st century there has been an influx of people from Africa, Asia and other parts of the world.

Lutheran missionaries first arrived in New Zealand in 1843, just three years after the signing of the Treaty of Waitangi.

The first Lutheran Missionaries arrived in Otago in January 1843. They found that the Wesleyan and Anglican Mission Societies were already well established in New Zealand. They therefore took up the suggestion that they move to the Chatham Islands where they arrived on 20 February of that year. As someone said, they had "...faith in their souls and next to nothing in their pockets."

In June of the same year, 1843, a shipload of German migrants arrived in Nelson. They settled in what is now Upper Moutere and built a church. There is still a thriving Lutheran congregation worshipping on this site.

In the 1860s a number of German people arrived in the Rangitikei. They convinced others from German speaking communities in South Australia to join them. Most initially settled along Pukepapa Road in Marton, which is still the location of the St Martin's Lutheran Church.

In the 1870s other Lutheran migrants arrived in New Zealand including large numbers from Scandinavia who settled in the Wairarapa, Manawatu and Hawkes Bay regions. Norsewood and Dannevirke owe their origins to these settlers.

North American migrations

Numerous waves of Old Lutherans immigrated to the United States as well during this time period. Among them was a group from Prussia of about 1000 Old Lutherans. They were from Erfurt, Magdeburg and the surrounding area, led by J. A. A. Grabau. They emigrated to the United States in summer 1839. Grabau and his friends founded the "Synod of Lutherans immigrated from Prussia", afterward known as the Buffalo Synod.

Thousands of other Old Lutherans settled in the Midwest and Upper Midwest of the United States during this period. In addition to Old Lutherans there were also Neo-Lutheran immigrants from the German Kingdom of Saxony, where there was no evangelical union. Lutheran pastor Martin Stephan and nearly 1100 other Saxon Lutherans left for the United States in November 1838, eventually settling in and around St. Louis, Missouri in the Saxon Lutheran immigration of 1838–39. These were the predecessors to the Lutheran Church–Missouri Synod.

See also
 German Australian
 Klemzig, South Australia, a major colony
 Kulturkampf
 Persecution of Christians
 Wends of Texas

References

Further reading
 Clark, Christopher. "Confessional policy and the limits of state action: Frederick William III and the Prussian Church Union 1817–40." Historical Journal 39.04 (1996) pp: 985–1004. in JSTOR
 Gerber, David A. "The pathos of exile: Old Lutheran refugees in the United States and South Australia." Comparative Studies in Society and History 26.03 (1984) pp: 498–522. online
 Henke, Manfred. "Toleration and Repression: German States, the Law and the ‘Sects’ in the Long Nineteenth Century." Studies in Church History 56 (2020): 338-361.
 Iwan, William, Because of their beliefs: emigration from Prussia to Australia [Uniform title: Um des Glaubens willen nach Australien (Engl.), 1931], David Schubert (trl. and ed.), Highgate, South Australia: H. Schubert, 1995. .
 Meyer, Charles. "'What a terrible thing it is to entrust one's children to such heathen teachers': State and Church Relations Illustrated in the Early Lutheran Schools of Victoria, Australia." History of Education Quarterly 40.3 (2000): 302-319. online
 Smith, Clifford Neal. Nineteenth-century Emigration of" Old Lutherans" from Eastern Germany (mainly Pomerania and Lower Silesia) to Australia, Canada, and the United States (Genealogical Publishing Company, 2009)
 Van Abbe, Derek. "The Germans in South Australia." Australian Quarterly (1956): 69–79. in JSTOR

External links 
 Germany, Lutheran Free Churches in from Christian Cyclopedia
 Lutherans. II Separate Lutherans. 1. In Prussia from Schaff-Herzog Encyclopedia of Religious Knowledge

History of Lutheranism in Germany
Christianity in Prussia
History of Silesia
Christian denominations founded in Germany
19th-century Lutheranism